PogChamps is a series of online amateur chess tournaments hosted by Chess.com. Players in the tournament are internet personalities, primarily Twitch streamers. PogChamps takes place over the course of two weeks. The first and second PogChamps had prize pools of $50,000 each, and the third and fourth iterations had prize pools of $100,000 each.

Tournament history
The first PogChamps tournament was announced in late May 2020 by Chess.com. The games were in a Rapid 10+5 Time control and all 16 players were streamers on Twitch. Running from June 5–19, the tournament was won by League of Legends streamer Voyboy. Coaching and commentary was provided primarily by Grandmaster (GM) Hikaru Nakamura and Woman FIDE Master (WFM) Alexandra Botez.

Some players returned from the first tournament, while others (such as David Pakman and Hafþór Júlíus Björnsson) played in the tournament for the first time. PogChamps 2's lineup included some players who were not primarily Twitch streamers. This event featured a slightly different format, with a double-round robin group stage. Coaches included previously mentioned Nakamura and Botez, as well as GM Daniel Naroditsky, Woman Grandmaster (WGM) Qiyu Zhou, International Master (IM) Anna Rudolf and IM Levy Rozman. The tournament was ultimately won by World of Warcraft and Hearthstone streamer Hafu (itshafu).

Notable contestants for the third event include streamers xQc (marking his third time participating), Ludwig and MoistCr1tikal (marking their second times participating), as well as Myth,  Pokimane, and Neekolul; YouTubers MrBeast and Michelle Khare, rapper Logic, actor Rainn Wilson and poker player Daniel Negreanu. In the announcement article, Chess.com noted how previous PogChamps tournaments, as well as other external events such as the success of The Queen's Gambit on Netflix, had led to a dramatic increase in the number of site registrations and daily games played, allowing them to gain several sponsorships for the third iteration of the series, which in turn led to an increased prize pool of $100,000. The tournament was won by French streamer Sardoche.

Sponsored by cryptocurrency marketplace Coinbase, the fourth iteration of the tournament has a $100,000 prize pool, with Chess.com matching up to $100,000 additionally for charity. In a Chess.com stream of the FIDE World Cup, Daniel Naroditsky confirmed that previous PogChamps participants MrBeast and Ludwig will return. This information was further corroborated by an article announcing that in addition to MrBeast and Ludwig returning, notable Spanish streamer Rubius would return as well for the fourth iteration of the event. The tournament was won by Dutch streamer Fundy.

Reception
Chess.com claimed that viewership for the first tournament exceeded its "ambitious estimates." Trent Murray of The Esports Observer commented that the number of hours of chess watched on Twitch increased in June 2020, the month in which the first PogChamps took place. Viewership increased especially after video of Cr1TiKaL checkmating xQc within 6 moves went viral. David Llada, Chief Marketing and Communications Officer for FIDE, said that the competition "demonstrates that chess can be fun from minute one."

The reaction to PogChamps from the Chess community has been mixed. While GMs Hikaru Nakamura, Daniel Naroditsky, and Robert Hess; IMs Anna Rudolf, Levy "GothamChess" Rozman, and Daniel Rensch; WGM Zhou; and WFMs Botez and Cramling have all supported PogChamps by coaching players and providing commentary for the matches, a few others have been critical of its popularity and growth. In February 2021, GM Ian Nepomniachtchi tweeted saying PogChamps 3 is promoted "as a popcorn stuff" and "is replacing and displacing any real chess content." GM Magnus Carlsen has called PogChamps a "good initiative" and tweeted that "[PogChamps 3] is doing a great job in [bringing] chess to more people." GM Anish Giri responded tweeting that he is "in a complete agreement [with Magnus Carlsen] for once."

Nepomniachtchi later clarified saying that he is "obviously happy more and more people are getting involved into chess." He voiced his concern saying the "indisputable success of Chess.com Pogchamps might set a new standard of a chess show" and he "can’t be sure it won’t prevail over other formats." In the twitter post he also mentioned that he had previously contributed to PogChamps by coaching PogChamps 2 winner itsHafu. GM Nakamura has shared his perspective on multiple occasions, supporting the tournament saying that "anything that brings chess to a bigger audience, anything where people can get into the game (and) understand it, is always going to be helpful for growing the game without a doubt."

Event results

Overview

PogChamps 1

Championship bracket

Consolation bracket

PogChamps 2

Championship bracket

Consolation bracket

PogChamps 3

Championship bracket

Consolation bracket

PogChamps 4

Championship bracket

Consolation bracket 

* Punz loss on forfeit. Win awarded to Tectone by default.

References

Further reading
 
 

2020 in chess
2020 in Internet culture
2021 in chess
2021 in Internet culture
June 2020 sports events
August 2020 sports events
September 2020 sports events
February 2021 sports events
Chess competitions
Twitch (service)